Abbasabad (also Romanized as ‘Abbāsābād) is a village in Yusefvand Rural District, in the Central District of Selseleh County, Lorestan Province, Iran.

Demographics 
At the 2006 census, its population was 69, in 16 families.

References 

Towns and villages in Selseleh County